The 18th National Television Awards was held at The O2 Arena on 23 January 2013. The event was presented by Dermot O'Leary; who himself was nominated for an award.

Awards

References

National Television Awards
N
2013 in British television
N
National Television Awards
National Television Awards